Captain Louis Peugnet House is a historic home located at Cape Vincent in Jefferson County, New York.  The limestone farmhouse was built about 1837 and is a -story five-bay structure with a central entry and a steeply pitched gable roof. It features an open porch with four square wooden columns that extends across the full width of the facade.  Also on the property is a 19th-century barn.

It was listed on the National Register of Historic Places in 1985.

References

Houses on the National Register of Historic Places in New York (state)
Houses completed in 1837
Houses in Jefferson County, New York
National Register of Historic Places in Jefferson County, New York
1837 establishments in New York (state)